Gaxiola is a Mexican surname that may refer to
Álvaro Gaxiola (1937–2003), Mexican Olympic diver
Daniel Amador Gaxiola (born 1956), Mexican politician
Emma Larios Gaxiola (born 1954), Mexican politician
Francisco Javier Gaxiola (1870–1933), Mexican lawyer, politician and diplomat
Hilda Gaxiola (born 1972), Mexican beach volleyball player
Jamillette Gaxiola (born 1989), beauty pageant contestant from Mexico 
José Francisco Madero Gaxiola (died 1833), Mexican surveyor and land commissioner
Luz Gaxiola (born 1992), Mexican track cyclist 
Luisa Gaxiola (born 1980), Mexican TV Anchor  
Yuridia Francisca Gaxiola (born 1986), Mexican singer 
Celso Gaxiola, Governor of Sinaloa 1911